Yuliwes Bellache (born 15 December 2002) is a professional footballer who plays as a midfielder for Austrian Bundesliga club Austria Lustenau, on loan from Clermont. Born in France, he is a youth international for Algeria.

Career
Bellache is a youth product of the academies of Saint-Priest and Clermont. He began his senior career with the reserves of Clermont in 2020 and became a mainstay of the team. He signed his first professional contract with Clermont on 6 July 2022 for one year. He joined the newly promoted club Austria Lustenau on loan on 27 August 2022. He made his professional and Austrian Football Bundesliga debut with Austria Lustenau in a 2–2 tie on 3 September 2022.

International career
Born in France, Bellache is of Algerian descent. He played for the Algeira U23s at the 2022 Maurice Revello Tournament.

References

External links
 
 OEFB Profile
 

2002 births
Living people
Footballers from Lyon
Algerian footballers
Algeria under-23 international footballers
French footballers
French sportspeople of Algerian descent
Clermont Foot players
SK Austria Klagenfurt players
Austrian Football Bundesliga players
Championnat National players
Association football midfielders
Algerian expatriate footballers
Algerian expatriate sportspeople in Austria
French expatriate footballers
French expatriate sportspeople in Austria
Expatriate footballers in Austria